Cavalier County is a county in the U.S. state of North Dakota. It is south of the Canada–US border with Manitoba. As of the 2020 census, the population was 3,704. Its county seat is Langdon.
The city of Cavalier is in nearby Pembina County.

History
The Dakota Territory legislature created Cavalier County on January 4, 1873 with territory annexed from Pembina County, but did not organize the county government structure at that time. It was named for Charles Cavileer (or Cavalier) of Pembina, an early settler.

The county organization was effected on July 8, 1884. Its boundaries were altered in 1883 and in 1887.

After petitioning the Territorial Governor for permission to organize the county, Patrick McHugh, W. Hudson Matthews, and L.C. Noracong met on July 8, 1884. On July 26 the new county officials met for the second time and chose Noracong as Chairman of the Board with William H. Doyle and Matthews as Commissioners. The first Register of Deeds and County Clerk was McHugh. W.J. Mooney became the first Judge of Probate, Charles B. Nelson was the first Cavalier County Supt. of Schools, and Clarence Hawkes the first Sheriff. Cavalier took its current form in 1887 after the Territorial Legislature authorized an increase in size by taking a portion from Pembina County. The expansion added 15 new townships to the county.

A site for a county seat was selected at the second meeting; it was named Langdon, for Robert Bruce Langdon of Minnesota, an official with the Great Northern Railroad. Langdon never visited the town, but reportedly donated a bell for the local school.

The first court house was built in 1884 at a cost of $360.00. It was used briefly and then abandoned for warmer and more centrally located quarters in a downtown bank. A large brick court house was built in 1895 on the present site at a contract cost of $9,099.00. This building served county officials until the current court house was constructed in 1957–58.

Cavalier County Historical Society
Established after 1969 - The Holy Trinity Church at Dresden, ND became the cornerstone of the County museum. It now houses local historic artifacts and landmarks.

The Holy Trinity Church at Dresden replaced two previous wooden structures that both burned. The present structure was erected in 1936, built out of fieldstone collected by the local parishioners. An architect from Minneapolis, Fabian Redmond, designed the building. A stonemason from Rugby ND, Edroy Patterson, directed volunteer workers.

Assisting in the building of the church were Andrew Bachman-head carpenter, Alphonse Hiltner, Stanley Koehmstedt and William Geisen.

Geography
Cavalier County is located on the north edge of North Dakota. Its north boundary line abuts the south boundary line of Canada. The Pembina River enters from Manitoba and flows southeasterly through the eastern part of the county, exiting near the SE corner. The county terrain consists of rolling hills, dotted with lakes and ponds in the western part. The terrain slopes to the east, with its highest point near the midpoint of the south boundary line at 1,644' (501m) ASL.

Major highways

  North Dakota Highway 1
  North Dakota Highway 5
  North Dakota Highway 20
  North Dakota Highway 66

Adjacent counties and rural municipalities

 Municipality of Louise, Manitoba (north)
 Municipality of Pembina, Manitoba (north)
 Rural Municipality of Stanley, Manitoba (north)
 Pembina County (east)
 Walsh County (southeast)
 Ramsey County (south)
 Towner County (west)

Lakes
 Rush Lake

Demographics

2000 census
As of the 2000 census, there were 4,831 people, 2,017 households, and 1,361 families in the county. The population density was 3 people per square mile (1/km2). There were 2,725 housing units at an average density of 2 per square mile (1/km2). The racial makeup of the county was 98.10% White, 0.14% Black or African American, 0.52% Native American, 0.10% Asian, 0.10% from other races, and 1.03% from two or more races. 0.64% of the population were Hispanic or Latino of any race. 44.5% were of German, 23.1% Norwegian and 6.4% French ancestry.

There were 2,017 households, out of which 27.50% had children under the age of 18 living with them, 60.80% were married couples living together, 3.80% had a female householder with no husband present, and 32.50% were non-families. 30.80% of all households were made up of individuals, and 17.00% had someone living alone who was 65 years of age or older. The average household size was 2.34 and the average family size was 2.93.

The county population contained 24.60% under the age of 18, 3.70% from 18 to 24, 21.30% from 25 to 44, 27.50% from 45 to 64, and 22.90% who were 65 years of age or older. The median age was 45 years. For every 100 females there were 98.90 males. For every 100 females age 18 and over, there were 97.60 males.

The median income for a household in the county was $31,868, and the median income for a family was $39,601. Males had a median income of $28,886 versus $19,647 for females. The per capita income for the county was $15,817. About 7.80% of families and 11.50% of the population were below the poverty line, including 16.60% of those under age 18 and 11.90% of those age 65 or over.

2010 census
As of the 2010 census, there were 3,993 people, 1,818 households, and 1,142 families in the county. The racial makeup of the county was 97.7% white, 0.9% American Indian, 0.2% Asian, 0.1% black or African American, 0.2% from other races, and 0.8% from two or more races. Those of Hispanic or Latino origin made up 0.6% of the population. In terms of ancestry, 44.5% were German, 28.8% were Norwegian, 10.8% were American, 5.8% were Irish, 5.7% were Swedish, and 5.4% were English.

Of the 1,818 households, 21.8% had children under the age of 18 living with them, 55.7% were married couples living together, 4.0% had a female householder with no husband present, 37.2% were non-families, and 34.2% of all households were made up of individuals. The average household size was 2.15 and the average family size was 2.74. The median age was 50.3 years.

The median income for a household in the county was $48,786 and the median income for a family was $57,066. Males had a median income of $41,885 versus $26,914 for females. The per capita income for the county was $26,468. About 6.1% of families and 8.2% of the population were below the poverty line, including 12.8% of those under age 18 and 10.8% of those age 65 or over.

Communities

Cities

 Alsen
 Calio
 Calvin
 Hannah
 Langdon (county seat)
 Loma
 Milton
 Munich
 Nekoma
 Osnabrock
 Sarles (partly in Towner County)
 Wales

Unincorporated communities

 Clyde
 Dresden
 Hove Mobile Park
 Maida
 Mount Carmel
 Olga

Townships

 Alma
 Banner
 Billings
 Bruce
 Byron
 Cypress
 Dresden
 Easby
 East Alma
 Elgin
 Fremont
 Glenila
 Gordon
 Grey
 Harvey
 Hay
 Henderson
 Hope
 Huron
 Langdon
 Linden
 Loam
 Manilla
 Minto
 Montrose
 Moscow
 Mount Carmel
 Nekoma
 North Loma
 North Olga
 Osford
 Osnabrock
 Perry
 Seivert
 South Dresden
 South Olga
 Storlie
 Trier
 Waterloo
 West Hope

Politics
Cavalier County voters have been reliably Republican for several decades. In only one national election since 1964 has the county selected the Democratic Party candidate (as of 2016).

See also
 National Register of Historic Places listings in Cavalier County, North Dakota

External links
 Cavalier County
 Cavalier County Museum
 History of Olga, North Dakota and Our Lady of the Sacred Heart Church : 1882-1982 from the Digital Horizons website
 Cavalier County maps, Sheet 1 (eastern) and Sheet 2 (western), North Dakota DOT

References

 
1884 establishments in Dakota Territory